Tenellia herrerai is a species of sea slug, an aeolid nudibranch, a marine gastropod mollusc in the family Fionidae.

Taxonomic history
The species was first described, then named as Cuthona herrerai in 2002. It was a Cuthona species until a DNA phylogeny of the former family Tergipedidae resulted in most species of Cuthona being transferred to the genus Tenellia, including Cuthona herrerai which became Tenellia herrerai.

Distribution
This species was described from Tarrafal de Monte Trigo, Santo Antão, Cape Verde Islands.

References 

Fionidae
Gastropods described in 2002
Fauna of Santo Antão, Cape Verde
Gastropods of Cape Verde